Yūto, Yuto or Yuuto is a masculine Japanese given name.

Possible writings
Yūto can be written using different combinations of kanji characters. Here are some examples: 

勇人, "courage, person"
悠人, "calm, person"
雄人, "male, person"
裕人, "rich, person"
優人, "gentleness, person"
祐人, "to help, person"
佑人, "to help, person"
勇斗, "courage, Big Dipper"
悠斗, "calm, Big Dipper"
雄斗, "male, Big Dipper"
裕斗, "rich, Big Dipper"
優斗, "gentleness, Big Dipper"
祐斗, "to help, Big Dipper"
佑斗, "to help, Big Dipper"
勇翔, "courage, to fly"
悠翔, "calm, to fly"
雄翔, "male, to fly"
優翔, "gentleness, to fly"

The name can also be written in hiragana ゆうと or katakana ユウト.

Notable people with the name

, Japanese manga artist
, Japanese rapper
, Japanese footballer
, Japanese footballer
, Japanese skateboarder
, Japanese football player
, Japanese voice actor
, Japanese football player
, Japanese football player
, Japanese football player
, Japanese rock guitarist
, Japanese dancer and singer
, Japanese football player
, Japanese football player
, Japanese footballer
, Japanese idol, singer and actor
, Japanese football player
, Japanese voice actor
, Japanese football player
, Japanese football player
, Japanese basketball player
, Japanese basketball player
, Japanese football player
, Japanese football player
, Japanese football player
, Japanese football player
, Japanese voice actor
, Japanese football player
, Japanese scenario writer originally from Saitama, Japan
, Japanese snowboarder
, Japanese manga writer of Food Wars!: Shokugeki no Soma
, Japanese football player
, Japanese actor, voice actor and singer
, Japanese footballer
, Japanese novelist and member of the Japanese Communist Party
, Japanese politician, mayor of Yokosuka, Kanagawa

Fictional characters
Yuto (ユート), a character from Yu-Gi-Oh! Arc-V
, a protagonist from Mikagura School Suite
, the protagonist of Omamori Himari
, main character in Nogizaka Haruka no Himitsu
, character from Real Girl
, the protagonist of Iro ni Ide ni Keri Waga Koi wa
, character in Danganronpa zero
, protagonist of Cross Edge
, a protagonist of High School DxD
, character from X
Yuto Miura (三浦 悠斗), character from W Juliet
, main character from Dracu-riot!
, the protagonist of Tonari no Kashiwagi-san
Yuto Sakurai (桜井 侑斗), character from Kamen Rider Den-O
, character from Love and Lies
, character from anime Ginga e Kickoff!!
Yuto Ijika ( 石鏡 いじか 悠 ゆう 斗 と), Character from Anime Twin Star Exorcists
Yuta Okkutso the protagonist of Jujutsu Kiasen 0

See also
Yūtō, Shizuoka, a former town  in Hamana District, Shizuoka Prefecture, Japan

Japanese masculine given names